Ilya Ivashka was the defending champion but chose not to defend his title.

Nikola Milojević won the title after defeating Enrique López Pérez 6–3, 6–4 in the final.

Seeds

Draw

Finals

Top half

Bottom half

References
Main Draw
Qualifying Draw

Fergana Challenger - Men's Singles
2018 Singles